Palniki is a rural locality (a settlement) in Dobryansky District, Perm Krai, Russia. The population was 568 as of 2010. There are 27 streets.

Geography 
Palniki is located 39 km south of Dobryanka (the district's administrative centre) by road. Adishchevo is the nearest rural locality.

References 

Rural localities in Dobryansky District